Lorraine Eckardt (September 13, 1914 – September 1991) was an American composer. Her work was part of the music event in the art competition at the 1932 Summer Olympics.

References

1914 births
1991 deaths
American women composers
Olympic competitors in art competitions
Musicians from Toronto
20th-century American women
Canadian emigrants to the United States